Rainer Dörner (born 28 August 1937) is a German middle-distance runner. He competed in the men's 3000 metres steeplechase at the 1964 Summer Olympics.

References

1937 births
Living people
Athletes (track and field) at the 1964 Summer Olympics
German male middle-distance runners
German male steeplechase runners
Olympic athletes of the United Team of Germany
Place of birth missing (living people)
20th-century German people